42 Draconis b (abbreviated 42 Dra b), formally named Orbitar , is a candidate extrasolar planet located approximately 315 light years from Earth in the constellation of Draco. It orbits the 5th magnitude K-type giant star 42 Draconis with a period of 479 days and 38% orbital eccentricity. The planet was discovered using the radial velocity method on March 20, 2009.

Following its discovery the planet was designated 42 Draconis b. In July 2014 the International Astronomical Union launched NameExoWorlds, a process for giving proper names to certain exoplanets and their host stars. The process involved public nomination and voting for the new names. In December 2015, the IAU announced the winning name was Orbitar for this planet. The winning name was submitted by the Brevard Astronomical Society of Brevard County, Florida, United States. Orbitar is a contrived word paying homage to the space launch and orbital operations of NASA.

A 2021 study found that more recent radial velocity measurements of 42 Draconis were inconsistent with the proposed planetary orbit, casting serious doubt on 42 Draconis b's existence, but with a two-planet solution still being a possibility. The study suggests that the radial velocity signal is likely caused by a yet unknown stellar phenomenon, which might be common in giant stars.

See also
 HD 139357 b
 Iota Draconis b

References

External links
 

Exoplanets discovered in 2009
Giant planets
Draco (constellation)
Exoplanets detected by radial velocity
Exoplanets with proper names